The National Golf Foundation (NGF) provides golf-business research and consulting services. Founded in 1936 by golf writer Herb Graffis and his brother Joe, who nearly went bankrupt in the process, its original mission was to publish authoritative research useful to investors developing the game of golf.  it had 6000 member companies.

References

External links 
National Golf Foundation
Golfbizwiki

Sports foundations based in the United States
Golf associations
Golf in the United States
Sports in Palm Beach County, Florida
1936 establishments in the United States
Sports organizations established in 1936
Non-profit organizations based in Florida